Blastococcus xanthinilyticus  is a Gram-positive and non-motile bacterium from the genus of Blastococcus which has been isolated from marble dust from the Bulla Regia monument in Tunisia.

References

External links
Type strain of Blastococcus xanthinilyticus at BacDive -  the Bacterial Diversity Metadatabase

Bacteria described in 2018
Actinomycetia